Dennis Michael Richardson (July 30, 1949 – February 26, 2019) was an American attorney, businessman, and politician who served as the 26th Secretary of State of Oregon from 2017 until his death in 2019. Richardson was from Central Point, Oregon and served six terms in the Oregon House of Representatives as a member of the Republican Party. He represented House District 4, which included portions of Jackson and Josephine counties, and was the Republican nominee for Governor of Oregon in the 2014 election, losing to incumbent Democrat John Kitzhaber.

In 2016, Richardson was the successful Republican nominee for Oregon Secretary of State, defeating Democratic candidate Brad Avakian with 47% of the vote to Avakian's 43%. , he is the most recent Republican to have been elected to statewide office in Oregon.

Early life education

The son of a carpenter, Richardson grew up in Southeast Los Angeles. He moved permanently to Oregon in 1979. Richardson was a member of the Church of Jesus Christ of Latter-day Saints.

He enlisted in the United States Army's Warrant Officer Helicopter Pilot Training Program. During his 1971 deployment, he flew combat missions out of Chu Lai, Vietnam. The South Vietnamese Army awarded him its Vietnamese Cross of Gallantry.

Richardson earned his bachelor's and law degrees at Brigham Young University.

Career

Early career 
After law school, Richardson set up his legal practice in Central Point, Oregon, where he worked for more than 30 years before retiring in 2010.

In 1984, Richardson was invited by the Reagan Administration to participate at the White House in a series of briefings by President Ronald Reagan and his Cabinet. Richardson served as Chairman of the Oregon Republican Party’s Second Congressional District in 1996–2000, and Treasurer of the Oregon Republican Party from 1999 to 2003. In 2000, Richardson was recruited to serve on the Central Point City Council, which helped inspire his decision to run for the Oregon State Legislature.

Oregon Legislature 
Richardson was elected to the Oregon House of Representatives in 2002, where he served for 12 years.

In his second term, Richardson was elected by unanimous vote of both Democratic and Republican colleagues as Speaker Pro Tempore of the Oregon House of Representatives’ 73rd Legislative Session (2005) and chosen to oversee multibillion-dollar health and human service budgets as Chair of the Joint Senate–House Ways and Means Subcommittee on Health and Human Services.

In his third term, Richardson was reelected and served in the 74th Legislative Assembly (2007), where he was selected to serve as the minority whip and as vice-chair of the House Health Care Policy Committee.

Prior to the opening of the 2011 session, Richardson served on the Republican negotiations team and helped craft the "Oregon Co-Governance Model." Later in 2011, Richardson was selected to oversee the $55 billion combined state budgets as co-chair of the Full Joint Senate–House Ways and Means Committee.

2014 gubernatorial campaign

In July 2013, Richardson announced his candidacy as a Republican candidate for the Governor of Oregon in 2014, with a strong focus on small business growth in the state. He won the nomination with 65% of the vote. Richardson went on to lose the 2014 General Election to Democratic incumbent, John Kitzhaber, who was elected to his fourth non-consecutive term as governor.

In the concluding weeks of the campaign, Richardson emphasized the corruption of Governor Kitzhaber and his administration and called for a federal investigation with a 13-page letter sent to the Federal Prosecutor in Portland, Oregon. Although insufficient to turn the tide on election day, newly re-elected Governor John Kitzhaber announced his resignation three months later on February 13, 2015.

Secretary of State

In October 2015, Richardson announced he would be running for Oregon Secretary of State in 2016, hoping to replace Democratic incumbent Jeanne Atkins, who had been appointed by Governor Kate Brown following Brown's ascension to the state's highest office due to then current Governor John Kitzhaber resigning amid an ethics scandal involving his fiancée. Atkins declined to seek election in the upcoming 2016 election. Unlike many states, Oregon does not have an office for lieutenant governor, therefore the Secretary of State is first in line of succession to the governor. He defeated his opponent, Brad Avakian, in the 2016 election.

He was the first Republican to win a statewide election in Oregon since 2002, the first Republican to be elected Oregon Secretary of State since Norma Paulus was reelected in 1980, and the only Republican to hold statewide office in Oregon. Richardson was administered the oath of office on December 30, 2016, and formally took office on January 2, 2017.

Personal life and death 
Following his honorable discharge from the Army, Richardson and his wife Cathy were married. His first marriage to Diane, produced a son, and his second marriage to Cathy resulted in eight daughters.

In May 2018, Richardson was diagnosed with glioblastoma, a rare form of brain cancer. He died from the effects of that illness on February 26, 2019, in Central Point, Oregon, aged 69.

Electoral history

References

External links
 Representative Dennis Richardson
 Richardson Campaign web site
 

|-

1949 births
2019 deaths
20th-century American lawyers
21st-century American lawyers
21st-century American politicians
United States Army personnel of the Vietnam War
Brigham Young University alumni
Candidates in the 2014 United States elections
Deaths from brain cancer in the United States
Deaths from glioblastoma
United States Army aviators
Latter Day Saints from Oregon
Republican Party members of the Oregon House of Representatives
Military personnel from California
Oregon city council members
Oregon lawyers
People from Central Point, Oregon
Politicians from Los Angeles
Recipients of the Gallantry Cross (Vietnam)
Secretaries of State of Oregon
United States Army officers